The Idaho Panhandle—locally known as North Idaho—is a salient region of the U.S. state of Idaho encompassing the state's 10 northernmost counties: Benewah, Bonner, Boundary, Clearwater, Idaho, Kootenai, Latah, Lewis, Nez Perce, and Shoshone (though the southern part of the region is sometimes referred to as North Central Idaho). The Panhandle is bordered by the state of Washington to the west, Montana to the east, and the Canadian province of British Columbia to the north. The Idaho panhandle, along with Eastern Washington, makes up the region known as the Inland Northwest, headed by its largest city, Spokane, Washington.   

Coeur d'Alene is the largest city within the Idaho Panhandle. Other important cities in the region include Lewiston, Moscow, Post Falls, Hayden, Sandpoint, and the smaller towns of St. Maries and Bonners Ferry. East of Coeur d'Alene is the Silver Valley, which follows Interstate 90 to the Montana border at Lookout Pass.

As of the 2010 Census, the population of the Idaho Panhandle was 317,751, around 20.3% of the state's total population of 1,567,582.

History

The eastern border of Idaho follows the Bitterroot Range, producing the narrow northern border.

Politics
No resident of North Idaho has been elected governor since the re-election of Cecil Andrus (D) in 1974. An Oregon native raised in Eugene, Andrus had lived at Orofino and was a resident of Lewiston when first elected in 1970. (Boise was his residence during his later campaigns of 1986 and 1990). The most recent member of the U.S. Congress from the Panhandle is Compton I. White Jr. (D) of  Clark Fork, last elected  in 1964.

North Idaho leans Republican, as does the state as a whole. Latah County, home of the University of Idaho in Moscow, is the only one of the region's 10 counties that does not. While Bonner County is also strongly Republican, the tourist town of Sandpoint located in the county is somewhat more centrist.

The Panhandle has traditionally been one of the strongest areas for Democrats in statewide elections, largely due to the unionized miners and a smaller Mormon population than Southern Idaho. However, it largely changed in the 1980s with the drop in silver prices, slump of metal markets, mine closures and passage of a right-to-work law. Additionally, the influx of conservatives from Southern California beginning in the 1970s, many of whom were retired LAPD officers who chose to move to Coeur d'Alene, also shifted the politics of the region. This intensified during the 2010s, with Democrats nationwide being perceived as too liberal. 

In the 1990 gubernatorial election, all counties were won by the incumbent Andrus, a popular moderate who easily won a fourth term. The Democratic nominee for Governor outperformed their statewide result in Northern Idaho in all elections from 1982 through 2006; Keith Allred received 30.9% in Northern Idaho vs. 32.9% statewide in 2010, A.J. Balukoff received 36.5% in Northern Idaho vs. 38.6% statewide in 2014, and Paulette Jordan received 34.6% in Northern Idaho vs. 38.2% statewide in 2018.

Attractions
Bird Aviation Museum and Invention Center
Clearwater River 
Idaho Panhandle National Forest
Kootenai River
Lake Coeur d'Alene
Lake Pend Oreille
Lookout Pass Ski and Recreation Area
North Idaho College
Priest Lake
Schweitzer Mountain
Snake River
Silver Mountain
Silverwood Theme Park
University of Idaho

Geography and climate
The Idaho Panhandle observes Pacific Time north of the western-flowing Salmon River in the southern part of Idaho County. The rest of the state to the south observes Mountain Time, which begins at Riggins. Though the Idaho Panhandle is at the same longitude as southwestern Idaho, the reasons for the different time zones are: 
(1) because Spokane is the commercial and transportation center for the region, and (2) there are many cross-border towns and cities that are connected, led by Spokane with Coeur d'Alene and Post Falls, followed by Pullman (home of Washington State University) with Moscow (home of the University of Idaho), and Clarkston with Lewiston.

The Panhandle is isolated from southern Idaho due to distance and the east-west mountain ranges that naturally separate the state. The passage by vehicle was arduous until significant highway improvements were made on U.S. Route 95 in North Central Idaho, specifically at Lapwai Canyon (1960), White Bird Hill (1975), the Lewiston grade (1977), and Lawyer's Canyon (1991).

Regional agriculture
The North Idaho region is most noted for silvaculture, the growing of trees and the production of lumber through the region's 12 lumber mills. The production of grass seeds and hops for beer production are also significant in the region. Nine microbreweries have operations in the area, making North Idaho highly characteristic of the Pacific Northwest. There are also many cattle ranches.

Notable crops from the Palouse region include wheat, lentils, peas, and canola.

Indian reservations
Coeur d'Alene Indian Reservation
Kootenai Indian Reservation
Nez Perce Indian Reservation

Major communities
Bonners Ferry
Coeur d'Alene
Dalton Gardens
Grangeville
Hayden
Kellogg
Lewiston
Lenore
Moscow
Orofino
Post Falls
Rathdrum
Sandpoint
St. Maries
Wallace

References

External links
Visit Idaho.org - official state site - North Idaho
U.S. Forest Service - official site - Panhandle National Forests
History of the Columbia Region Territories - Washington State Historical Society

Regions of Idaho